Backyard Farmer is a cooperative television program produced by the University of Nebraska–Lincoln Extension and Nebraska Public Media. First broadcast in 1953, the show has run for more than 60 years, making it one of the longest-running programs in American television history. It airs live at 7 PM Central Time every Thursday from April through September on Nebraska Public Media.

The program's content is exclusively home lawn and gardening information with an emphasis on Nebraska flora and climate considerations. The format consists of a panel of experts, usually from Nebraska Extension, that share information and respond to viewer questions.

Overview 
The structure of the show consists of a host who fields viewer questions about home lawn and gardening as well as flora and fauna native to Nebraska to a panel of four specialists. The four specialists are experts in the fields of Entomology, Horticulture, Plant Pathology, and Turf Grass and Weeds.  Also on the show are segments featuring a plant-of-the-week, live plant and pest samples, as well as a "Lightning Round". During the "Lightning Round" the panelists compete to answer as many viewer questions as possible during a 60-second time frame. During live shows, Backyard Farmer telephone operators field about 200 calls and 100 emails to find good questions for the panel to answer. Most viewer questions revolve around topics including soil preparation, water conservation, organic food production, landscape practices and edible landscapes.

History
Backyard Farmer first aired in 1953 on Lincoln, Nebraska, station KFOR-TV, moving to NET in 1955. (The KFOR license was donated in 1954 to the University of Nebraska by John Fetzer, who also owned competing Lincoln TV station KOLN, to create NET's flagship station, KUON-TV.) The University's KUON-TV station was run out of the basement of the Temple building on campus.

Backyard Farmer was the brainchild of George Round and Jack McBride. George Round was the Director of University Relations. Jack McBride was the founder of the University of Nebraska Television Department and general manager of the Nebraska ETV Network, which consisted of nine stations.

Backyard Farmer was the fourth Nebraska ETV Network program to begin broadcasting on the KUON-TV network.  Both George Round and Dwayne Trenkle were the original hosts and moderators.  The show consisted of a host and four specialists.

In the 1960s, Backyard Farmer had the highest rating of any educational broadcast in the United States. The show claims to be "The longest running locally produced program in television history."

Cast

Current cast (2017 season)
Kim Todd, Fred Baxendale, Jim Kalisch, Wayne Ohnesorg, Tom Weissling, Jonathan Larson, Roch Gaussoin, Bill Kreuser, Matt Soucek, Loren Giesler, Amy Timmerman, Kevin Korus, Sarah Browning, Elizabeth Killinger, Jeff Culbertson, Kelly Feehan and Dennis Ferraro.

Phone Volunteer

Gladys Jeurink - 1977–Present

Specialty cast positions

References

External links
Website of Backyard Farmer

1953 American television series debuts
1950s American documentary television series
1960s American documentary television series
1970s American documentary television series
1980s American documentary television series
1990s American documentary television series
2000s American documentary television series
2010s American documentary television series
2020s American documentary television series
Environment of Nebraska
Gardening in the United States
Nature educational television series